This is a list of hurling managers. It includes managers currently managing a county team in all levels in order of the date of their appointment.

Managers

References